Brent Pelham Windmill is a Grade II listed smock mill at Brent Pelham, Hertfordshire, England which is derelict.

History
Brent Pelham Mill was built in 1826 by William Halden, who was at Meesden windmill in 1827. It was working until at least 1890 and was disused by 1898. At some point the mill was stripped of machinery and a water tank was built on the smock tower. The mill survives in this form today, clad in corrugated iron.

Description

Brent Pelham Mill is a two-storey smock mill on a single-storey brick base. It had four sails and drove two pairs of  millstones. The weatherboarding is vertical, and survives under the corrugated iron.

Millers
Peter Harris 1839-54
Thomas Miles 1855-63
Walter Watson 1863-90
Reference for above:-

References

External links
Windmill World webpage on Brent Pelham Mill.

Windmills in Hertfordshire
Smock mills in England
Grinding mills in the United Kingdom
Windmills completed in 1826
Grade II listed buildings in Hertfordshire
Grade II listed windmills
Octagonal buildings in the United Kingdom
1826 establishments in England